The Michaelis School of Fine Art was founded in 1925, and is the Fine Arts department of the University of Cape Town. The school's current director is Associate Professor Kurt Campbell.

There are three research institutions associated with the school, namely The Lucy Lloyd Archive, Research and Exhibition Centre (LLAREC), the Centre for Curating the Archive (CCA) and the Katrine Harries Print Cabinet, which has been instrumental in promoting printmaking as well as conserving and exhibiting prints in the collection.

The major graduate degree offered at the School is the Master of Fine Art where students work in both new and traditional fine art disciplines.

Program
Courses are offered in New Media, Painting, Photography, Printmaking, Sculpture and Curatorship.

References

External links
Official site of Michaelis School of Fine Art
ARC: the Visual University and its Columbarium
Lucy Lloyd Archive Resource and Exhibition Centre (LLAREC) now part of the CCA
History of the Michaelis Collection

Art schools in South Africa
University of Cape Town
1925 establishments in South Africa